J with stroke (majuscule Ɉ, minuscule ɉ) is a letter of the Latin alphabet, derived from J with the addition of a bar through the letter. It is used in Arhuaco to represent a sound similar to the j in English just.

A similar letter  (turned f) is used to represent a voiced palatal plosive in the International Phonetic Alphabet.

Code positions

Latin letters with diacritics